Liberation Day: Stories is a book of short stories by the American writer George Saunders. It collects stories published in various magazines between 2013 and 2022, along with a few new stories. The book was published October 18, 2022 by Random House.

Contents

Reception
Kirkus Reviews described it as: "A tour de force collection that showcases all of Saunders' many skills." Colin Barrett, writing for The New York Times, described the collection as "a spiky, at times difficult collection, seldom providing the reader with much in the way of catharsis."

Former US President Barack Obama listed it as one of his favourite books of 2022.

References

External links
"The Mom of Bold Action" in The New Yorker
"Elliott Spencer" in The New Yorker

2022 short story collections
American short story collections
Random House books